Volksrust is a town in the Mpumalanga province of South Africa near the KwaZulu-Natal provincial border, some 240 km southeast of Johannesburg, 53 km north of Newcastle and 80 km southeast of Standerton.

History

The town was laid out in 1888 on the farms Boschpad Drift, Rooibult or Llanwarne, Verkyk and Zandfontein, and proclaimed in 1889. Municipal status was attained in 1904.

Dorothea de Jager, daughter of Dirk Uys, one of the battle victims, named the town Volksrust (Nation's Rest). The name probably refers to the citizens resting here after the Battle of Majuba on 27 February 1881, a decisive battle leading to the Transvaal's victory against the British in the First Boer War. During the Second Boer War the British authorities built a Boer concentration camp in Volksrust. Visiting officials and army officers described the conditions of the camp as poor, though it suffered a death rate below the Transvaal average. A memorial exists in Volkrust town square to the Boer women and children who died in the camp.

Agriculture
Volksrust has important beef, dairy, maize, sorghum, wool and sunflower seed industries.

Notable people
The Miss World 2014, Rolene Strauss, was born here.

References

External links 
 
 Google Map
 Volksrust Home Page

Populated places in the Pixley ka Seme Local Municipality
Second Boer War concentration camps
Populated places founded by Afrikaners